Denis Semyonovich Rustan (born 9 November 1983) is a former Russian professional football player.

Club career
He played 3 seasons in the Russian Football National League for FC Sportakademklub Moscow, FC Nosta Novotroitsk and FC Fakel Voronezh.

References

External links
 

1983 births
Footballers from Moscow
Living people
Russian footballers
Association football midfielders
FC Sheksna Cherepovets players
FC Fakel Voronezh players
FC Khimki players
FC Nosta Novotroitsk players
FC Sportakademklub Moscow players